During the 1999–2000 English football season, Cambridge United F.C. competed in the Football League Second Division where they finished in 19th position on 48 points.

Final league table

Second Division

Results
Cambridge United's score comes first

Legend

Football League Division Two

League Cup

FA Cup

Football League Trophy

Squad
Appearances for competitive matches only

References

Cambridge 1999–2000 at soccerbase.com (use drop down list to select relevant season)

See also
1999–2000 in English football

Cambridge United F.C. seasons
Cambridge United